Acusa is a monotypic moth genus of the family Erebidae. Its only species, Acusa acus, is only known from Sabah on Borneo. Both the genus and the species were first described by Michael Fibiger in 2011.

The wingspan is about 13 mm. The forewings are brown, suffused with six black dots on the costa. The medial area is dark brown near the costa. There are indistinct crosslines, except the terminal line, which is marked with black interveinal dots. The fringes are brown. The hindwings are light brown, darkest near base and with an indistinct discal spot. The terminal line is brown and the fringes are light brown. The underside is unicolorous brown and the ventral area of the hindwing is light brown. There is a discal spot on the hindwing.

References

Micronoctuini
Monotypic moth genera
Noctuoidea genera
Moths of Borneo